"Chuck Versus the Lethal Weapon" is the sixteenth episode of the second season of Chuck. It originally aired on March 9, 2009. When Cole Barker (Jonathan Cake) escapes after being tortured by Fulcrum and returns to Castle, Sarah Walker and John Casey are assigned to hunt down a scientist (Robert Picardo) codenamed "Perseus", who is the mastermind behind Fulcrum's plans to build their own Intersect. Chuck Bartowski learns that a man codenamed "Orion" is the designer of the Intersect and headed the entire Intersect project. Meanwhile, Sarah wrestles with her feelings for Cole and Chuck, and Morgan tries to talk Anna out of moving in with him after previously agreeing to move in with Chuck.

Plot

Main plot
Cole Barker (Jonathan Cake) is tortured by a group of Fulcrum agents to learn who possessed the Intersect. Later, John Casey brings Chuck Bartowski to Castle and Casey and Sarah prepare to take him to a secure location to protect his identity. Suddenly, a bloodied and exhausted Cole arrives, having escaped the Fulcrum agents without compromising Chuck's cover.

General Beckman (Bonita Friedericy) orders the team to capture a Fulcrum agent codenamed "Perseus," the lead scientist in the development of the Fulcrum Intersect, during an event at a Swiss consul office. While Sarah and Casey attend the party wearing cameras, Cole and Chuck will monitor them from Castle. Chuck flashes on Dr. Howard Busgang (Robert Picardo), a DOD scientist whom he suspects is Perseus. Meanwhile, Duncan (Vincent Duvall), whom Cole recognizes as one of the Fulcrum agents who tortured him, disables Sarah and Casey's surveillance cameras, worrying Cole. Cole gives Chuck a gun and they leave Castle to assist Sarah and Casey.

Duncan holds Sarah, Casey, and Howard at gunpoint and leads them away from the party, and Howard asserts that he was not aware of Fulcrum's intentions. Outside, Cole starts to climb a balcony to enter through a window, but Chuck notices that he is bleeding. Chuck climbs to the window and sees Casey and Sarah, and Cole tells him to attack the agents in 20 seconds. Chuck tries to surprise the agents, but, having never used a gun, drops it and accidentally shoots Howard, who manages to escape. Casey and Sarah use the distraction to break free. Sarah grabs a gun and chases after Duncan. Just as Sarah is about to be shot, Cole dives in front of Sarah to save her. Chuck walks out into the hallway and tells Casey that he hurt his ankle, only to sees that Cole has taken a bullet for Sarah.

When Beckman informs the team that Howard was a technician for the Intersect, Chuck realizes that Howard might be able to remove the Intersect from his head. Later, Chuck returns home and shows Ellie Bartowski and Devon Woodcomb his injured ankle, and they tell him to go to the hospital. At the hospital, Chuck sees Howard being treated for his gunshot wound, and calls Casey, so that they can capture Howard. As Chuck follows Howard, a Fulcrum agent spots him and calls his team. Chuck follows Howard into an office, pretending that he is on a Buy More maintenance call. As Howard takes cash out of his safe, Chuck enters Howard's lab. Howard sees him and points a gun at him, recognizing Chuck as the one who shot him. As Sarah, Casey, and Cole find Howard's receptionist dead, Chuck reveals that he knows about the Intersect. After Chuck flashes on documents titled "Orion," Howard realizes that Chuck is the human Intersect. Chuck asks Howard if he can remove the Intersect, and Howard says that Orion, the chief designer of the Intersect, might be able to. Duncan arrives and shoots Howard dead and injures Cole, before being shot by Sarah.

Later, Chuck inquires about Orion, but Beckman tells him that her people have not yet located him. Cole leaves, wishing Chuck good luck for removing the Intersect and advising him to start carrying a gun.

Later, Chuck meets with Sarah in front of his apartment and tells her that he has decided not to move in with her (See "Chuck and Sarah"). He says that once he removes the Intersect, he will live the life that he wants. Afterward Chuck walks into the apartment and tells Ellie that he is not moving out (See "Chuck, Morgan, and Anna"). He then takes down his Tron poster, revealing a chart on the back with all the information he has gathered about the Intersect and Operation Bartowski. He adds Orion to the top of the chart.

Chuck and Sarah
When Cole is captured, Sarah moves in with Chuck as a precaution. She tells Chuck that when they get an apartment, they can have separate rooms. Chuck tells Sarah that he saw a connection between her and Cole, but she says that it is purely professional. At breakfast, Ellie tells Sarah that she is excited that she and Chuck are moving in together. Meanwhile, Chuck has not yet told Morgan that they cannot be roommates.

When Cole later takes a bullet to save Sarah, she tends to his wounds. Though Sarah tries to remain professional, Cole claims to be hurt that she is not responding to him, judging it unfair that they cannot just take off together. He later tells her that he was ordered to have medical attention 24 hours a day and asks her to take care of him. She declines in order to remain in her cover relationship with Chuck.

Later, Chuck meets with Sarah in front of his apartment. He tells her that he understands what she sees in Cole. Chuck tells Sarah that he cannot live with her and continue to suppress his feelings. He tells her that when he removes the Intersect, he will live the life that he wants.

Chuck, Morgan, and Anna
Morgan Grimes prepares to move in with Chuck to avoid his mother's relationship with Big Mike. However, Anna finds the lease papers that Morgan had for him and Chuck. She assumes that her and Morgan will move into together. Rather than tell Anna the truth, Morgan decides to annoy her into changing her mind. First, he declines spending time with her to play Wii Tennis with Jeff Barnes and Lester Patel.

Next, Morgan gives Anna a set of rules that she needs to agree to before they move in together, titled the "Morgannuptials," which she happily signs. Chuck gives Morgan a pep talk about not losing Anna, and Morgan cancels his plans to move in with Chuck. Chuck is relieved, as he also had to cancel the arrangement to move in with Sarah, and he assures Morgan that he is making the right decision.

Production
This episode marked the first appearance of the chart on Chuck's Tron poster and the first reference to Orion, both of which were recurring plot points in the season.

Flashes
 Chuck flashes on Howard.
 Chuck flashes on Orion.

Cultural references
 Cole, when asked what his real name is while being interrogated by the Fulcrum agents, quotes the famous introduction of fictional British superspy James Bond.
 The title of the episode is taken from Lethal Weapon.
 Morgan says, "Laugh it up, fuzzballs," a slight variation of the line Han Solo told Chewbacca in The Empire Strikes Back.
 When told by Cole to "always go for the knee," Chuck asks if he means to "sweep the leg," referencing The Karate Kid, where Sensei John Kreese (Martin Kove) gives Johnny Lawrence (William Zabka) the same advice to defeat Daniel LaRusso (Ralph Macchio).
 When Morgan is preparing for his game of Wii Tennis, his plan is to re-create a Wimbledon match of John McEnroe's. Anna responds with McEnroe's famous line "You can't be serious."

Critical response
"Chuck Versus the Lethal Weapon" received positive reviews from critics. Steve Heisler of The A.V. Club gave the episode a B−, concluding, "Look, the show is still a lot of fun to watch (loved Jeff's sweaty almost-embrace of Anna, and Chuck's inadvertent dance when his leg gets caught in the window, among other things), and this new Orion angle -- the creator of the Intersect, who might be able to get it out of Chuck's head -- shows promise, particularly the fact that Chuck has been conducting his own little research in private (putting his findings on the back of his Tron poster). But please, enough with the repetition.
"

Eric Goldman of IGN gave the episode an 8.2 out of 10, writing that he was initially disappointed by Chuck's first use of a gun. Goldman enjoyed the reveal of Chuck's chart on the back of his Tron poster, concluding, "This reveal that Chuck is not idly standing by but has actually been actively keeping track of his now-crazy life is a great little twist."

The episode drew 5.796 million viewers.

References

External links
 

Lethal Weapon
2009 American television episodes